Vladimir Ranković (born 27 June 1993) is a German professional footballer who plays as a right full-back.

Club career 
Ranković started playing football at the age of only four and joined then local FC Hertha München. Subsequently he went through the youth ranks of SpVgg Unterhaching and SV Pullach before moving to the youth academy of Bayern Munich in 2005 when he was twelve years old. Eventually he made it into Bayern Munich's second team, playing in fourth tier Regionalliga at that time, debuting as a starter in a league match versus SC Freiburg II on 11 March 2012. It remained his only cap in the 2011–12 season, although he became a team regular for the next and after next season (2012–14), playing 33 and 31 games respectively. On 4 May 2013, he received his first and only call for Bayern Munich in the Bundesliga, being an unused substitute in an away match against Borussia Dortmund. Under new head coach Pep Guardiola he also was allowed to participate in the first team's pre-season training for the 2013–14 Bundesliga.

In July 2014, when his contract with Bayern Munich had been expired, he moved to fellow Bundesliga side Hannover 96 on a free transfer, signing a three-year contract until 2017. For Hannover however, he did not receive a single call for an official match during the first leg of the 2014–15 campaign. In the winter break, he was consequently loaned to 2. Bundesliga side Erzgebirge Aue for the remainder of the season. For Aue he became a regular, starting in eleven matches consecutively. At the end of the season, Aue was relegated to the 3. Liga and Ranković returned to Hannover.

In June 2017, Ranković joined 3. Liga club Hansa Rostock on a free transfer, signing a two-year deal until 2019. Leaving Hansa at the end of the his contract, he remained without club until 24 January 2020, where he signed for the rest of the season with Regionalliga Bayern club FC Memmingen.

International career 
Born in Germany, Ranković is of Serbian descent. From 2009 to 2013, Ranković has earned caps for several Germany national youth teams, most recently having served the U20 team.

Career statistics

Personal life 
He is of Serbian ancestry and has three brothers.

References

External links 
 

1993 births
Living people
German footballers
Germany youth international footballers
FC Bayern Munich II players
FC Bayern Munich footballers
Hannover 96 players
Hannover 96 II players
FC Erzgebirge Aue players
FC Hansa Rostock players
FC Memmingen players
2. Bundesliga players
3. Liga players
Regionalliga players
German people of Serbian descent
Association football fullbacks
Footballers from Munich